Barto Hill is a summit located in Central New York Region of New York located in the Town of Fairfield in Herkimer County, east of Fairfield. Sugarloaf is located northeast of Barto Hill.

References

Mountains of Herkimer County, New York
Mountains of New York (state)